Harry Charles McCaffery (November 25, 1858 in St. Louis, Missouri – April 19, 1928 in St. Louis) was a 19th-century professional baseball player.  He primarily played outfield for the St. Louis Browns of the American Association. However, his major league debut was with the Louisville Eclipse, for whom he played one game before joining the Browns.

External links

1858 births
1928 deaths
Major League Baseball outfielders
St. Louis Brown Stockings (AA) players
Louisville Eclipse players
Baseball players from St. Louis
Davenport Brown Stockings players
Lawrence (minor league baseball) players
19th-century baseball players